(born 6 February 1985) is a Japanese speedskater whose specialty is in the sprinting distance event of 500 metres. At the age of 17 he became the first junior speedskater to skate the 500 metres in less than 35 seconds.

Until 9 March 2007 he was the world record holder with the 34.30 he skated in Salt Lake City on 19 November 2005. He lost the world record to Lee Kang-seok, who skated 34.25 in Salt Lake City.

At the age of 20, he became the 500 metres world champion at the 2005 World Single Distance Championships, leaving behind Hiroyasu Shimizu and Jeremy Wotherspoon. After this achievement he was considered to be one of the favourites for achieving a medal at the 2006 Winter Olympics in Turin.  Prior to that 500 metre race, he named three skaters as his toughest competition: Jeremy Wotherspoon of Canada, Joey Cheek of the United States, and Dmitry Dorofeyev of Russia. Cheek and Dorofeyev won gold and silver, respectively, while Kato finished in sixth place.  He was also beaten by his own countryman, Yūya Oikawa, who was fourth.

He represented Japan at the 2010 Winter Olympics in Vancouver where he won bronze at men's 500 metres.

At the 2014 Olympics in Sochi, Russia, he again represented Japan and finished 5th in the 500 m with a combined time over two runs of 69.74 and a fastest single time of 34.77 behind the Mulder brothers (Michel and Ronald), Jan Smeekens and Mo Tae-bum.

He is a member of the Nidec Sankyo speed skating team.

World record 

Source: SpeedSkatingStats.com

References

External links
Joji Kato at SpeedSkatingStats.com
Photos of Joji Kato
Kato names three threats for gold

1985 births
Japanese male speed skaters
Speed skaters at the 2006 Winter Olympics
Speed skaters at the 2010 Winter Olympics
Speed skaters at the 2014 Winter Olympics
Speed skaters at the 2018 Winter Olympics
Olympic speed skaters of Japan
Medalists at the 2010 Winter Olympics
Olympic medalists in speed skating
Olympic bronze medalists for Japan
Speed skaters at the 2003 Asian Winter Games
Speed skaters at the 2007 Asian Winter Games
Speed skaters at the 2011 Asian Winter Games
Medalists at the 2003 Asian Winter Games
Medalists at the 2011 Asian Winter Games
Asian Games medalists in speed skating
Asian Games gold medalists for Japan
Asian Games bronze medalists for Japan
World record setters in speed skating
Sportspeople from Yamagata Prefecture
Living people
World Single Distances Speed Skating Championships medalists
21st-century Japanese people